Helen Bennett (August 14, 1911 – February 25, 2001) was an American actress. She appeared in numerous films and TV series from the 1930s to the 1990s.

Early life
Bennett was born in Springfield, Missouri, in 1911. She attended the University of Missouri and was named Miss Missouri in 1937. Subsequently, she attended the acting school of the Goodman Theatre in Chicago and had a brief modeling career in New York.

Career
Bennett started her acting career in the late 1930s, appearing in films such as The Middleton Family at the New York World's Fair, The Royal Mounted Rides Again, Because of Him, The Scarlet Horseman, Lost City of the Jungle, Francis in the Haunted House and Step Down to Terror.

She also appeared in TV series like Lux Video Theatre, The Donna Reed Show, No Job for a Lady and The Vice.

Bennett also had her own program, The Sue Bennett Show, which she hosted during 1954.

During the 1960s, Bennett worked as a voice actress for commercials.

Personal life
Bennett was married to Sylvester James Andrews. They had no children.

Death
Bennett died on February 25, 2001, in Santa Monica, California, at the age of 89.

Filmography

Film
 The Middleton Family at the New York World's Fair (1939) – uncredited
 The Royal Mounted Rides Again (1945) – Dillie Clark
 Because of Him (1945) – Reporter
 The Scarlet Horseman (1946) – Mrs. Ruth Halliday
 Blonde Alibi (1946) – Ruth Dixon
 Lost City of the Jungle (1946) – Indra
 On the Threshold of Space (1956) – Mrs. Lange
 Francis in the Haunted House (1956) – Mrs. Hargrove
 Kelly and Me (1957) – Columnist
 Return to Peyton Place (1961) – Interviewer (uncredited)

Television
 Lux Video Theatre – Payment in Kind (1957) TV episode .... Helen
 The Donna Reed Show – Sleep No More My Lady (1959) TV episode .... Mrs. Spaulding
 No Job for a Lady – A Member of the Committee (1990) TV episode .... Journalist
 The Vice – Sons: Part 1 (1999) TV episode .... Jill Melia – Sons: Part 2 (1999) TV episode .... Jill Melia

References

External links
 
 

1911 births
2001 deaths
American film actresses
American television actresses
American stage actresses
Actresses from Missouri
20th-century American actresses